The Borg-Warner 35 transmission (BW-35) is an automatic transmission produced by the BorgWarner company. This article also applies to variations—the M-36 and M-37. When this article refers to "M-3x" it refers to all models. When model number specific it will use the exact model number.

The "3" in the number refers to the specific series of transmission. The M-3x, 4x, 5x and 6x transmissions are all aluminum cased transmissions that are related to the M-35 (the first of the aluminum Borg-Warner automatics). In this case the rising series number is relative to transmission strength—a larger number will withstand more power than a smaller number. This isn't, however, a general rule with Borg-Warner automatics. The earlier M-8 and M-1x cast iron case transmissions are much stronger than the aluminum models, although the M-6x may handle as much power as the M-1x series. The second number refers to a specific variation. This usually indicates a higher torque load capability, but may refer to other variations that may not increase torque rating.

The M-3x has three forward and one reverse gears. The selector lever varies depending on years and car models the transmission is used in. All models follow a quadrant which has six stations. Early models have two drive positions marked with a "2" and a "1" (P-R-N-D2-D1-L; Park, Reverse, Neutral, D2, D1 and Lock). These models start off in Second gear when in the D2 position. This is useful for economy in relatively flat terrain and for starting on slippery surfaces (wet mud, snow, ice, etc.). When placed in the D1 position the transmission shifts through all three forward gears. In "Lock" the transmission can be locked to prevent upward gear changes and will provide maximum engine braking in 1st gear and moderate engine braking in 2nd gear. By selecting L from stationary, or before an upward gear change into 2nd gear, the transmission will become locked in 1st gear. By selecting L from D2 or D1 while in 2nd gear, the transmission will become locked in 2nd gear or from D2 or D1 when cruising below 55 m.p.h (88 k.p.h.) will effect an immediate downward change and lock in 2nd gear. In both these instances, the transmission will automatically change down into 1st gear when the car speed drops below 5 m.p.h. (8 k.p.h.). Should 1st gear be required earlier, reduce the car speed to below 30 m.p.h. (48 k.p.h.) and effect a "kick-down" gear change.  Many people assume they have a two speed transmission because they expect the first Drive position (D2) to shift through all three gears as all automatic transmissions have done since 1968. Some vehicles had the same system without the D1 and D2, instead just having D, and only 5 stations on the quadrant.

Starting in 1965 the M-3x was made with the now common P-R-N-D-2-1 shift arrangement (Park, Reverse, Neutral, Drive, Second gear, First gear). AMC called this "Shift-Command" to differentiate it from the D2/D1 models, since either could be ordered in an AMC/Rambler automobile from 1965 to 1967.

The M-36 was introduced in 1965. It is essentially the same as the M-35 except that it has provisions for an external transmission oil cooler. The M-35 was air cooled by the torque converter with a fan on it. The M-35 case has provisions to be drilled for an external cooler, but no U.S. models used an external cooler and do not have the internal provisions to mount one. There may be European models that were equipped with external coolers. An external oil cooler made it suitable for heavier vehicles and/or towing heavier loads. AMC used the M-36 behind the 232 six in their Ambassador starting in 1965.

The M-37 is first mentioned in the 1967 AMC Technical Service Manual (TSM). It was used behind the 232 in larger vehicles. It has a higher torque rating than the M-35 and M-36. By 1967 the M-36 was relegated to the 199 six, the 232 received the stronger M-37 in all AMC vehicles.

European models may differ.

Description
The Borg Warner 35 automatic transmission comprises a torque converter, and a fully automatic 3-speed hydraulically controlled epicyclic gear box. The automatic transmission provides three forward speeds, and one reverse gear ratio.

As is common in automatic transmissions of its generation, power brought to the transmission via the torque converter drives hydraulic fluid. As the gears move faster or slower, pressure of the fluid increases or decreases in the case. Mechanical switching of gears is triggered by the increase or decrease of pressure. There are no electronic sensors or switches as found in modern transmissions. There is a Throttle Valve in the control valve body that is connected to the throttle linkage via a cable. This regulates internal pressure by throttle position. A secondary function of this cable is to down-shift ("kick down") to a lower gear when the Throttle Valve is in the full stop position (throttle pedal is fully depressed) and road speed is below a set point regulated by a mechanical governor on the output shaft.

The hydraulic control system consists of a valve arrangement and an engine driven pump. The automatic transmission contains a planetary gear set consisting of two sun gears, two sets of three planet pinions contained within a planetary carrier and ring gear. Various speed ratios are obtained by holding or clutching various combinations of elements of the planetary train. This is performed by two bands, two multi-disc clutches and a one-way clutch.

When the transmission of the motionless vehicle is placed in Drive, the transmission allows the vehicle to move off in first gear, then will change to second and then to third gear based on an increase in road speed. The BW-35 will downshift from third to second and from second to first, also based on load. The transmission is equipped to produce kickdown and will upshift after kickdown if accelerator pressure is released following a kickdown.

The Borg Warner 35 was designed for use with Type F Automatic Transmission Fluid (ATF), which is far less common today than the Mercon/Dexron type.

Users
Prior and contemporary automatic transmissions were very inefficient and would work best with larger, more powerful engines, and even when used in those applications, the engines would often have higher compression ratios and more power than the manual transmission versions. Prior automatic transmissions were used with the small sixes in the US in the late 50s and early 60s, but the heavy internal components of the early automatics were detrimental to economy, the main reason a lighter automatic transmission was developed.

In addition, lower differential ratios differentials were usually used in other automatic transmission applications to improve gas mileage (again due to the inefficiency of the earlier automatics, especially when used with small engines). The BW 35 was a more efficient transmission and was quite successful in the US with the smaller engined cars. This also made it a natural for European cars that usually had much smaller engines than American cars of that era. Production was transferred in 1960 to the Borg-Warner plant at Letchworth in Great Britain. The BW-35 was offered to European automobile producers where it was widely used.

The BW-35 was also manufactured in Australia from 1963 and was used on numerous Australian made cars.

AMC
Used behind the 195.6, 199 and 232 six cylinder
Ambassador 1965-1969
American 1963-1968
Rambler 1969
Rogue 1967-1969
Classic 1963-1966
Rebel 1967-1969
Marlin 1965-1967
Javelin 1968-1969

Austin
FX4 - FL2 (ADO 6)
A60 Cambridge (ADO 38)
Freeway (Australia - ADO 40 (Mk I) and YDO 3 (Mk II))
A110 Westminster (ADO 53 - Mk II only)
1800 - 2200 (ADO 17) - Model 35TA - Transverse Installation Using Morse Hy-Vo chain to transmit the drive.
3 Litre (ADO 61)
Kimberley and Tasman (Australia YDO 19) Transverse installation.
18-22 (ADO 71) Transverse installation.
Ambassador (LM19) Transverse installation.

Citroën
Citroën DS Longitudinal two shaft transaxle installation.
Citroën SM Longitudinal two shaft transaxle installation.

Daimler
2.5 V8 - 250
SP250 Dart

Datsun
1967 Datsun RL411 SSS (SuperSportSedan) and 1600 ('Bluebird'); (same engine as the SR311 'Fairlady' roadsters).
Datsun PL510 - Optional on both sedans and wagons.

Holden
Torana HB Only

Jaguar
XJ6 Series 1, engine size 2.8
Mark 2
S-Type

Leyland
Princess (ADO 71) Transverse Installation
P76 (Australia - used with both 2.6l six cylinder and 4.4l V8)
The 4.4l V8 engine may be the largest capacity engine ever fitted to a Model 35.

Mazda
1500
1800

MG
MGB Mk II
MGB GT
MGC Roadster
MGC GT
Magnette IV (ADO 38)

Morris
Oxford Series IV (ADO 38)
Marina (ADO 28)
1800 - 2200 (ADO 17) Transverse installation.
18-22 (ADO 71) Transverse Installation

Reliant
Scimitar GTE SE5 (1968–72) and SE5A (1972–75) with Essex V6.

Riley
4/72 (ADO 38)

The Rootes group (United Kingdom) (later Chrysler UK)
Hillman Minx, Super Minx, Hunter, Minx (Arrow range 1725cc only)
Humber Hawk, Super Snipe, Imperial, Sceptre, Arrow range Sceptre
Singer Gazelle, Vogue, Vogue (Arrow range), Gazelle (Arrow range 1725 cc only)
Sunbeam Alpine, Rapier, Rapier (Arrow range), Alpine(Arrow range), Vogue (Arrow range)
Hillman Avenger & Plymouth Cricket 1250, 1300, 1500 & 1600

In the mid-1970s, the Arrow & Avenger ranges switched to a B-W Type 45 4-speed transmission

Rover
3 Litre - 3.5 Litre (P5 & P5B)
2000 - 3500 (P6 & P6B)

Saab
Saab 99, 900, 90 (1970 to 1993) Models 35 & 37 - longitudinal installation using Morse Hy-Vo chain to transmit the drive.

Toyota
Corona Australian Production From 1969.
Crown Australian Production From 1968 (Imported Crowns during this period used Aisin A30 & A40 transmissions)

Triumph
2000 - 2500
Stag
Dolomite

Vauxhall
Viva HB Only

Volvo
Between 1964 and 1976, BW-35 transmissions were used in the models 120, 1800, 140, 160 and 240.

Wolseley
16/60 (ADO 38)
24/80 (Australia - ADO 40 (Mk I) and YDO 3 (Mk II))
6/110 (ADO 53 - Mk II Only)
18/85 (ADO 17) Transverse installation.
Six (ADO 17) Transverse installation.
Saloon (ADO 71) Transverse installation.

Ford UK & Australia
Taunus TC1 & TC2 (Except 1.3L engine option)
Escort Mk1
Capri Mk1
Cortina Mk1, Mk2 & early Mk3 (later Marks used Ford C3)
Corsair V4
Escort and Cortina gear ratios are as follows:
1st gear: 2.393:1
2nd gear: 1.450:1
3rd gear: 1.000:1
Reverse: 2.094:1
mk3 zodiac and zephyr

Ford (Australia)
Early automatic Ford Falcons used the two-speed Fordomatic, from 1960 to 1965.  This was then complemented with, and finally replaced by a modified form of the Borg-Warner 35 (marketed initially as 'Fordomatic 3S', then 'Fordomatic'/Cruise-o-matic, and lastly 'Cruisomatic' along with the C-4 and FMX automatics, whereupon the names were dropped with the XC Falcon update) which was used on six-cylinder Falcons until 1989 when the BTR M91 electronic 4 speed auto was introduced (however the new Borg Warner 51 was still used in the Falcon utility and panel van until the XG Falcon Ute replaced the XF in 1993). The gear ratios from the Ford Falcon XD specifications (3.3 and 4.1 litre Six; Borg-Warner 35-3) are typical of all and are as follows:
1st: 2.39:1
2nd: 1.45:1
3rd: 1.00:1
Reverse: 2.09:1

The 4.1 litre Six (as an optional transmission) and 4.9 litre V8 used the Ford C4-3. The gear ratios from the Ford Falcon XD specifications are typical of all and are as follows:
1st: 2.46:1
2nd: 1.46:1
3rd: 1.00:1
Reverse: 2.20:1

The 5.8 litre V8 came equipped with the Ford FMX-3, which was an evolved three-speed Ford-O-Matic (designed by Borg Warner Corporation), via the "MX" and "FX" (Cruise-O-Matic) transmissions to become the FMX in 1968. The gear ratios from the Ford Falcon XD specifications are typical of all and are as follows:
1st: 2.40:1
2nd: 1.47:1
3rd: 1.00:1
Reverse: 2.00:1

Chrysler (Australia)
From 1967 to 1981, the Borg-Warner 35 transmission was also used in the 6-cylinder Australian Chryslers, Valiants, Chargers and Centuras. The specification-change from the Torqueflite automatic transmission to the Borg-Warner 35 transmission was due to a requirement for more local content. The Borg-Warner 35 transmission was used behind the Hemi 6 engines. Later production models made a running change to the Borg-Warner 40 and 50 Series units to fall into product supply lines as with Ford Australia

References

Automatic transmission tradenames
35